Planina na Pohorju is a settlement in the Municipality of Zreče in northeastern Slovenia. It lies in the Pohorje Hills, north of the town of Zreče. The area is part of the traditional region of Styria. It is now included with the rest of the municipality in the Savinja Statistical Region.

Name
The name of the settlement was changed from Planina to Planina na Pohorju in 1953.

References

External links
Planina na Pohorju at Geopedia

Populated places in the Municipality of Zreče